The  in Naruto, Tokushima Prefecture is an art museum founded in 1998 and is one of the largest exhibition spaces in Japan.

Established by Otsuka Pharmaceutical as a celebration of its 75th anniversary, it houses over a thousand full-size ceramic reproductions of major works of art, including the Sistine Chapel, Scrovegni Chapel, triclinium of the Villa of the Mysteries, and Guernica. The works are transfer-printed from photographs before being fired and retouched. The purpose of this is to give Japanese people who cannot travel abroad the opportunity to see these famous pieces. A robot named 'Mr Art' gives hour-long gallery talks. The museum cost industrialist Masahito Ōtsuka $400,000,000.

Gallery

See also

 The Work of Art in the Age of Mechanical Reproduction

References

External links
 Ōtsuka Museum of Art - homepage 

Museums in Tokushima Prefecture
Ceramic art
Ceramics museums in Japan
Otsuka Pharmaceutical
1998 establishments in Japan
Naruto, Tokushima
Art museums established in 1998
Art museums and galleries in Japan